Pestyakovsky District is an administrative and municipal district (raion), one of the twenty-one in Ivanovo Oblast, Russia. It is located in the southeast of the oblast. Its administrative center is the urban locality (a settlement) of Pestyaki. Population:   8,629 (2002 Census);  The population of Pestyaki accounts for 61.8% of the district's total population.

References

Notes

Sources

Districts of Ivanovo Oblast